Galaxy is a 1981 video game published by Avalon Hill and developed by Microcomputer Games for the Apple II, TRS-80, Atari 8-bit family, Commodore PET, Commodore 64, IBM PC compatibles, FM-7, and TI-99/4A. It was originally published as Galactic Empires by Powersoft in 1979.

Contents
Galaxy is a strategy game for up to 20 players, in which the object is to conquer the most planets within a number of turns as chosen by the players before the game starts.

Reception
Bruce Webster reviewed Galactic Empires in The Space Gamer No. 31. Webster commented that "It is one of the five best computer games and easily the best multi-player computer game I've ever seen."

Dana Holm reviewed Galaxy in The Space Gamer No. 61. Holm commented that "In the multi-player computer games market, there are not that many games.  This is a welcome addition to that collection."

Reviews
Computer Gaming World - Nov, 1992
80 Micro (Aug, 1981)

References

External links
Review in PC Magazine

1981 video games
Apple II games
Atari 8-bit family games
Avalon Hill video games
Commodore 64 games
Commodore PET games
DOS games
FM-7 games
Space conquest video games
Space trading and combat simulators
TI-99/4A games
Video games developed in the United States